SEU Worship is an American synth-pop band signed to Provident Label Group. based in Lakeland, Florida. The group is formed by several members of different areas of the Southeastern University in Florida, who are in charge of performing and writing the songs that are mainly focused on the weekly chapels.

History
Their first release was the Live album No Other Name on 2013. Since then they have released 11 albums, 3 extended plays, 2 albums in spanish and 1 EP in spanish.

Musical style
The band mostly creates pop music, emphasizing on phrophetic lyrics

.

Discography

Albums
2013: No Other Name
2014: So All The World Will Know
2015: Faith To Believe: Live At The House Of Blues
2016: For This Purpose
2017: SEU Worship
2018: Heaven Life
2020: A Thousand Generations
2020: Clouds Are Clearing: Mixtape 1A
2021: Clouds Are Clearing: Mixtape 1B
2022: Walk With You
2022: Heart Cry

EP's
2013: From The Vanguard Room
2014: HOLA
2017: Born To Run
2020: Eden To Eternity

Spanish Albums (SEU Worship Hola)

2016: Con Propósito
2017:  SEU Worship Hola

References

External links

American synth-pop groups
Christian pop groups
Southeastern University (Florida)
Provident Label Group artists